Le Fur is a surname. Notable people with the surname include:

Gérard Le Fur (born 1950), French entrepreneur
Marc Le Fur (born 1956), French politician
Marie-Amélie Le Fur (born 1988), French wheelchair athlete

Surnames of French origin
Breton-language surnames